John Zimmer is the co-founder and president of Lyft, an  on-demand transportation company, which he founded with Logan Green in 2012.

Early life
Zimmer grew up in Greenwich, Connecticut. In 2006, Zimmer graduated at Cornell University School of Hotel Administration where he was a member of Sigma Pi Fraternity. After graduation, Zimmer worked as an analyst in real estate finance at Lehman Brothers in New York City.

Zimmer left Lehman Brothers three months before it declared bankruptcy. In 2007, while Zimmer was working at Lehman Brothers, he and Logan Green founded Zimride, a ridesharing platform across college campuses.

Zimride

Inspiration
While at Cornell, Zimmer was inspired to develop a rideshare program by filling the empty seats he had during his rides home over school breaks: “I was driving from Upstate New York to New York City and all around me were these empty seats.” As a student at Cornell, Zimmer took a City and Regional Planning Class, called Green Cities (taught by Dr. Robert Young, now at the University of Texas at Austin). The class discussed the principles of simple design changes to large infrastructure, which would later influence the development of Zimride.

Zimmer and Green were introduced through a mutual friend on Facebook. Green had posted details about his new company called “Zimride,” which interested Zimmer, who had been keeping a journal about carpooling ideas.

Co-founding of Zimride
Within a week of being introduced, Green flew out to New York City to meet with Zimmer. Zimride launched the first version of its rideshare program at Cornell University where, after six months, the service had signed up 20% of the student body. Later in 2007, Zimride was active on both the Cornell and UCSB campuses. Green and Zimmer promoted the service through guerilla marketing campaigns; in particular, the pair would dress in frog and beaver suits and hand out flyers to students on the Cornell campus. Later, while on a Lehman Brothers recruiting trip, Zimmer was recognized by a potential recruit, who asked "I swear I recognize you—were you in a beaver suit on Saturday on campus?"

Growth
Zimmer quit his job at Lehman Brothers to work with Green full-time on Zimride. When asked why he quit, Zimmer said, "The feelings I had about what I wanted to do and what was important to me didn’t match up with the culture in Wall Street. There was a focus on money, there was a focus on what people were wearing, and things that didn’t seem to lead to productivity."

Green and Zimmer focused the service on carpooling between connected users and making carpooling fun and interesting. By April 2012, Lyft (formerly Zimride) had raised $7.5 million in funding and was active at over 125 universities.

Lyft

Founding
After leaving his job at Lehman Brothers, Zimmer moved to Silicon Valley with Green to work on Zimride full-time. Lyft was launched in the summer of 2012 as a service of Zimride. The change from Zimride to Lyft was the result of a hackathon that sought a means of daily engagement with its users, instead of once or twice a year. In May 2013, Zimmer and Green officially changed the name of the company from Zimride to Lyft. Zimmer did not take a salary during the first three years of Lyft's operation, and he and Green worked on the company out of an apartment they shared.

Growth

Investments 
In June 2013, Lyft completed a $60 million Series C venture financing round led by Andreessen Horowitz, bringing its total amount raised to $83 million. In July 2013, Lyft sold Zimride to Enterprise Holdings, the parent company of Enterprise Rent-A-Car, enabling the company to focus exclusively on the growth of Lyft. In April 2014, Lyft completed a $250 million Series D financing round led by Coatue, Alibaba, and Andreessen Horowitz, bringing its total amount raised to $332.5 million. In January 2016, Lyft announced the closing of a 1 billion Series F financing round led by GM, which contributed $500 million of the total, bringing its total amount raised to date to $2.01 billion. On April 11, 2017, Lyft closed a $600 million Series G financing round which included investors such as Kohlberg Kravis Roberts and PSP Investments. On December 5, 2017, Lyft announced a Series H financing round worth $1.5 billion led by Alphabet Inc.

Features and users 
In August 2014, Lyft introduced Lyft Line, a ridesharing product that utilizes its existing driver network to transport passengers going the same direction at the same time. To incentivize riding together, Lyft Line offers passengers discounted costs. This feature harkens back to Zimmer and Green’s original goal for Zimride.

, Lyft is available to 95% of the U.S. population and in Toronto.

Personal life 
Zimmer is married. He met his wife while studying abroad in Seville, Spain. They have a daughter named Penélope, who was born in December 2015. Zimmer supports the ACLU.

Recognition
In 2009, Zimmer and Logan Green were named finalists in Business Week’s list of America’s Best Young Entrepreneurs.

In 2014, Zimmer was named in Forbes’ “30 Under 30: Technology” list, and both he and Green were named in Inc. Magazine’s “35 Under 35” list.

Zimmer has spoken at events including SXSW and TechCrunch Disrupt.

In 2017, Zimmer received the Cornell Hospitality Innovator Award from the Cornell University School of Hotel Administration.

References

External links
Zimride.com
John Zimmer on Twitter

1983 births
Living people
Lyft people
American company founders
Cornell University School of Hotel Administration alumni
American chief operating officers